Fly FM is an English-language Malaysian private radio station owned by Media Prima Berhad. It was launched on 3 October 2005 and targets listeners aged between fifteen and thirty years old. Fly FM is the second most popular English radio station in Malaysia, besides being the fastest growing radio station in the country. The music on Fly FM is aired in both English and Malay.

This station used to broadcast live from KLIA and is the first radio station in the world to be situated in an airport.

History

In 2007, Fly FM introduced a programme slot called "50 minutes of non-stop music" where the crew will air songs for 50 minutes without commercials.

The station was initially launched by Jason Cottam and the popular deejay, Fly Guy (Saufian Mokhtar), as  its public face. Together with Yvonne Natalie Kniese (Natalie), they hosted they morning show called "The Pagi Show". Natalie, who went to was later replaced by Phat Fabes and soon after Fly Guy was replaced by Ben (Loh Ben Jern). Soon Nadia was added as the 3rd host of the show.

From 26 June 2011 onwards, Phat Fabes & Ben were moved to the evening slot. The morning show was renamed as "The Pagi Rock Crew" (named after LMFAO's hit song Party Rock Anthem) run by Hafiz & Prem along with original morning crew DJ, Nadia. Nadia left the station on 20 March 2012.

In 2013, Zher & Guibo were introduced as the "All New Pagi Rock Crew". After a year, they were moved to the evening slot. The current morning show is called "Ben & Hafiz" whilst the night show "Fly 30" is managed by Ivan.

In 2015, Ben's retirement led to the formation of a new morning slot called the #FlyWolfPack consisting of Hafiz, Dennis and Guibo.

In 2017, after Dennis left, the morning show was renamed "Fly Fm's Hafiz and Guibo." In August 2017, Zher left Fly FM as well.

In 30 July 2021, Douglas Lim joins Ili for Fly FM's Breakfast Show. Starting from 2 August 2021, Fly FM was officially rebranded into a hot adult contemporary radio station.

On March 28, 2022, Fly FM will no longer broadcast temporarily through the MYTV platform.

Show

Weekdays
 The JoKeRs in the Morning (6-10am)
 Fly 45 with Natalie (10am-2pm)
 Fly Drive with Ryan (4-8pm)
 Gen eF with Fifi & Elysha (8pm-12am)

Weekend
Top 40 With Ryan (10am-1pm)
Fly Weekends with Raqeem, Rika & Gabe (1-5pm)
Best of the Fly FM JoKeRs (5-7pm)
 TikTok Showdown Elysha & Fifi (7-8pm)
Fly Malaysia Shawn & Moots (8-9pm)
Fly Nite Club with DJ Reeve, Jakeman & Skeletor and Ramsey Westwood (9pm-12am)

Radio Announcer
 Douglas Lim
 Juanita Ramayah
 Ryan Matjeraie
 Natalie Kniese
 Elysha Arnold
 Izleen Izham (Fifi)
 CZA
 Reeve
 Ramsey Westwood
 Wakeman & Skeletor
 Gabriel Noel Pountney
 Ryan Howlett
 Adam Raqeem
 Rika Adrina
 Kavin Jay

Former Radio Announcer
 Guibo 
 Maggy Wang
 Loh Ben Jern
 Dennis Yin
 Saufian Mokhtar
 Hafiz
 Premo Supremo
 Hunny Madu 
 Ili Ruzanna 
 Ivan Leong Ka Yen
 Zher Peen

Frequency

References

External links 
 

2005 establishments in Malaysia
Radio stations in Malaysia
Radio stations established in 2005
Media Prima